Igor Vukojević (born 1975 in Doboj, Yugoslavia) is a Bosnian singer, musician and songwriter.

Igor started playing guitar when he was 10 years old, composed his first song when he was 11 and did his first song arrangement at 14 years old. By that time he already played 3 instruments - drums, bass and guitar.

Vukojević has participated in the Bosnian national selection for the Eurovision Song Contest, BH Eurosong, twice, finishing third in 2003 and 2005.  He also participated in the semi-final of its Serbian counterpart, Beovizija, in 2007, finishing last (20th).

Discography
Rat i mir (1996)
Samo ona (2001)
Ringispil (2003)
Bijelo zlato (2006)
Lovac i plijen (2010)

External links
 

1975 births
Living people
People from Doboj
Bosnia and Herzegovina musicians
Serbs of Bosnia and Herzegovina
Hayat Production artists
Beovizija contestants